This is an incomplete list of rowing clubs and their colors.

Australia

Belgium

Croatia

The Netherlands

Poland

Portugal

Spain

United Kingdom

United States

References

External links

 OarSpotter.com (List of most oars from around the World)

Blades - Club oars